The National Integrity Party (Partido de Integridad Nacional, PIN, or in some English-speaking countries, NIP) is a former political party in Guatemala.  It was a "personalistic Arbenzista party" founded in Quezaltenango in 1949 with the goal of countering the opposition Independent Anti-Communist Party of the West, which was active in the same region.
In 1952 the party merged with the other non-Communist parties supporting the Árbenz presidency (the National Renovation Party, the Revolutionary Action Party, the Socialist Party and the Popular Liberation Front) to form the Party of the Guatemalan Revolution.

References

Defunct political parties in Guatemala
Political parties established in 1949
Guatemalan Revolution